Shabir Ibrahim Kaskar (died 12 February 1981) was notorious Indian criminal based in Mumbai. He was the elder brother of Dawood Ibrahim, the current gang leader of the D-Company. The risen of Shabir and Dawood in Mumbai's underworld and the sympathetic attitude of the Mumbai police toward them evoked the jealous and resentment of other established gang member from the Pathan gang that dominat South Mumbai area. Final, the inter-gang rivalry grew to such an extent that Manya Surve, his gang and Amirzada and Alamzeb plotted to kill Shabir and Dawood. On 12 February 1981, they gunned Shabir down at petrol pump in Prhadevi.

The murder of Shabir is an important chapter in Mumbai's underworld as it unleashed a gruesome gang war between Dawood Ibrahim gang and the Pathan gang leading to a spate of shootouts until the retired don Karim Lala requested a truce, and eventually the Pathan gang's dominance was replaced by the Dawood Ibrahim gang.

Early life and entry into crime
Shabir Ibrahim Kaskar, the son of a police head constable Ibrahim Kaskar Maniyar , hailed from Mumka village in Ratnagiri district, Konkan region in the Indian state of Maharashtra in 1955. He belongs to the Maniyar/Manihar Muslim community.

His father Ibrahim Kaskar was a police constable in the CID department at Azad Maidan police station. The family had eight children and they were perennially impoverished. Shabir and his younger brother, Dawood were school dropouts and often spent their days wandering in the streets of Dongri-Bhendi Bazar. In those days, people lived in fear and awe of Karim Lala, the leader of the Pathan gang and Haji Mastan, the smuggler who enjoyed a cult following among the impoverished Muslim youths in South Mumbai including Shabir and Dawood.
Soon, Shabir and Dawood joined in the petty street crime of selling smuggled electronics goods and watches. They often cheated gullible travelers and got involved in street brawls. 
Shabir, Dawood, and their friends called their group, "Young Company." They would hang out near Crawford Market in search of gullible travelers and offer them smuggled Rolex watches for a measly price compared to the actual cost. After the buyer paid them in cash, they would pretend to wrap the watch in a small paper or cloth and tell the buyer not to open it to avoid police suspicion. It would be a stone instead of the watch. They called this activity "Alta-palti." If the buyer found out that he had been cheated and accosted them, they would intimidate him with the help of burly Pathan hoodlums from the neighborhood.
Their father requested Haji Mastan to give his wastrel sons decent employment. On Mastan's instructions, they worked in an electronic shop at Manish Market for some time, but very soon they were back to their petty crime and mob fights. Soon they found their way into the Pathan gang where they did odd jobs often transporting contraband and illegal goods from one place to another.

Rivalry with the Pathan gang 
The Pathan gang was run by Karim Lala. He was supported by his Pathan cronies like Amirzada, Alamzeb, his nephew Samad Khan, Saeed Batla, and Ayub Lala. The Ibrahim brothers worked with Bashu dada and other gangsters. Being the sons of a police constable and due to the Pathan gangs increasing violence and notoriety Dawood would gain the support of the Mumbai police and develop what was seen at the time as a symbiotic relationship to clean up Mumbai city of its “trash”, term used to describe criminals who target innocents and law enforcement.  

By some accounts Mumbai police officers decided to deliberately turn a blind eye to the Criminal activities of Ibrahim  brothers while  using their help to target the larger Pathan gang. This resulted in the Ibrahim brothers committing attacks against the Pathan gang with immunity and gaining the support of the general public, law enforcement and local newspapers who hailed them as the “protectors of the community“. The most active among the journalist who supported the brothers and helped paint them as heroes was Iqbal Naatiq. In fact Iqbal would play a role in bringing together the police and Ibrahim brothers to combat the Pathans, who he felt unnecessarily targeted innocent civilians. After  Iqbal Naatiq tipped-off the police about Ayub Lala and Saeed Batla’s  illegal gambling and liquor dens they kidnapped Naatiq and brutally stabbed him 67 times leaving him for dead .

In popular culture
Manoj Bajpai's character Zubair Imtiaz Haksar in the film, Shootout at Wadala was based on Shabir Ibrahim Kaskar.  Shootout at Wadala initially premiered the name as Shabir Ibrahim Kaskar on their promos, which later on changed to Zubair Imtiaz Haksar.

References

External links
 SAW Original trailer includes Shabir name

Criminals from Mumbai
Indian Muslims
D-Company
1981 deaths